Ilia Lekach is the chief executive officer of Adrenalina. He was the former chief executive officer of Parlux (Nasdaq: "PARL"), a company that makes perfume. Best known brands are Paris Hilton and Guess brands.

References

American chief executives of fashion industry companies
American cosmetics businesspeople
Living people
Year of birth missing (living people)